Trax may refer to:

Music
Trax (album), the debut album from Japanese electronic music group Ravex
TRAX (band), a Korean rock band
Trax Records, first house music label owned by Larry Sherman in Chicago
Trax (sequencer), an old MIDI sequencer
Trax (duo), featuring the Danish singer Lise Haavik

Transport

Automobiles
Chevrolet Trax, a subcompact SUV introduced in 2012
Chevrolet Trax (concept car), a subcompact crossover SUV concept that debuted in 2007
Force Trax, a mid-size SUV built since 1988, originally called Bajaj Tempo Trax

Rail
TRAX (light rail), a light rail system in the Salt Lake City area

Computing
TrAX, the Transformation API for XML (now considered a part of JAXP)
Trax Image Recognition, also known as Trax Retail, a Singaporean software technology company

Toys and games
Trax (game), a strategy board game played with tiles
Trax (video game), a shooter game developed by HAL Laboratory
Trax Models, a brand of Australian classic diecast model cars and buses

Other uses
LG Trax (CU575), a mobile phone from AT&T Mobility
Trax (nightclub), Charlottesville, Virginia
Trax Colton (born 1929), American actor
Trax FM, a radio station based in South Yorkshire, England

See also

Tracks (disambiguation)
TRAXX (disambiguation)
Thrax (disambiguation)